Brassolini is a tribe usually placed in the brush-footed butterfly subfamily Morphinae, which is often included in the Satyrinae as a tribe Morphini. If this is accepted, the Brassolini become the sister tribe of the Morphini among the Satyrinae. Formerly, they were treated as an independent family Brassolidae or subfamily Brassolinae. Many members of this tribe are called owl butterflies.

The Brassolini is a Neotropical butterfly group that currently includes 102 species and contain 17 genera in two or three subtribes, depending whether the enigmatic genus Bia is assigned here as the most basal lineage. The other genera are divided into one small and more ancestral subtribe, and a more advanced one that unites the bulk of the genera.

The Brassolini butterflies with characters form adult stage show a more stronger phylogeny than those with of early stages.

Genera

Genera are listed in the presumed phylogenetic sequence.

Subtribe Biina (tentatively placed here)
 Bia
Subtribe Naropina
 Aponarope
 Narope
Subtribe Brassolina
 Brassolis
 Dynastor
 Dasyophthalma
 Opoptera (= Mimoblepia)
 Caligo – giant owl butterflies
 Caligopsis
 Eryphanis
 Selenophanes
 Penetes
 Catoblepia
 Mielkella
 Orobrassolis
 Blepolenis
 Opsiphanes

References

   (2007)  Evaluating the monophyly and phylogenetic relationships of Brassolini genera (Lepidoptera, Nymphalidae).  Systematic Entomology, 32: 668-689.
  (2008): Tree of Life Web Project – Brassolini. Version of 2008-JAN-30. Retrieved 2009-APR-07.
 Brassolini Virtual Collection. , Web-based resource: http://fs.uno.edu/cpenz/Brassolini.html Retrieved 2012-MAR-13.
 Research on Brassolini. , Web-based resource: http://fs.uno.edu/cpenz/rese-brassolini.html Retrieved 2012-MAR-13.

Taxa named by Jean Baptiste Boisduval
Butterfly tribes